Carniella forficata is a species of comb-footed spider in the family Theridiidae. It is found in China.

References

Theridiidae
Spiders described in 2014
Spiders of China